Stroud Road was a railway station on the North Coast railway line in New South Wales, Australia. It was originally opened in 1913 to serve the town of Stroud, which was some distance away, as this was as near as the railway could get at an affordable cost. Stroud Road eventually grew into a small town in its own right.

References

Regional railway stations in New South Wales
Railway stations in Australia opened in 1913